Pseudoverrucous papules and nodules are a skin condition characterized by striking 2– to 8–mm, shiny, smooth, red, moist, flat-topped, round skin lesions in the perianal area of children.

See also 
 Skin lesion

References 

Skin conditions resulting from physical factors